P45 is a regional Ukraine road (P-highway) in Sumy Oblast and Kharkiv Oblast, Ukraine, running mainly north-south and connecting Sumy with Bohodukhiv in sloped line. It begins in Sumy at Bandera Street (Highway H07/Highway P61) and Illinska Street, and travels straight through central Sumy. It passes through Verkhnya Syrovatka, Stinka, Hlybne, Samotoivka, Krasnopillya, Zemlyane, Mezenivka, Slavhorod, Porozok, Pozhnya, Druzhba, Shurove, Shyrokyi Bereh, Vilne, Velyka Pysarivka, Rozsoshi, Vinnytski Ivany, Leskivka, before terminating in Bohodukhiv at Tretyakivska Street (Highway P46) and Kharkivska Street.

Main route

See also 

 Roads in Ukraine
 Ukraine State Highways

References

External links 
 Start of P45 road in Sumy
 End of P61 road in Bohodukhiv

Roads in Kharkiv Oblast
Roads in Sumy Oblast